A nod of the head is a gesture in which the head is tilted in alternating up and down arcs along the sagittal plane.  In many cultures, it is most commonly, but not universally, used to indicate agreement, acceptance, or acknowledgement.

To indicate acceptance
Different cultures assign different meanings to the gesture. Nodding to indicate "yes" is widespread, and appears in a large number of diverse cultural and linguistic groups. Areas in which nodding generally takes this meaning include the Indian subcontinent (note that the head bobble also shows agreement there), the Middle East, Southeast Asia, most of Europe, South America and North America. Nodding may also be used as a sign of recognition in some areas, or to show respect. An insult may be inferred if it is not returned in kind.

In Greece, the single nod of the head down that indicates "yes" is often combined with closing the eyes simultaneously. This nod commonly also includes a very slight, almost unnoticeable, turn of the head to the left (or to the right).

An early survey of nodding and other gestures was The Expression of the Emotions in Man and Animals, written by Charles Darwin in 1872. Darwin wrote to missionaries in many parts of the world asking for information on local gestures, and concluded that nodding for "yes" was common to many different groups.

There are varying theories as to why nodding is so frequently used to indicate acceptance. One simple theory is that it is a form of bowing, indicating that one is prepared to accept what another person is saying or requesting.  It has also been stated that babies, when hungry, search for milk by moving their heads vertically, but decline milk by turning their head from side to side.

To indicate refusal
There are several exceptions: in Greece, Cyprus, Iran, Turkey, Bulgaria, a single nod of the head up (not down) indicates a "no". Some cultures also swap the meanings between nodding and head shaking. 

Specifically in Greece and in Cyprus, the single nod of the head up that indicates "no" is almost always combined with a simultaneous raise of the eyebrows and most commonly also with a slight (or complete) rolling up of the eyes. The dental click sound, called "τσου" (tsou) in Greek, often accompanies this gesture. This sound bears heavy resemblance, but is not identical, to the British tutting sound. The use of "τσου" is optional and reserved only for heavy emphasis on the "no".

The emphasis on the raised eyebrows and the rolling up of the eyes is such, that the actual nod of the head upwards has ended up being of secondary importance. A person can denote "no" by simply raising their eyebrows and rolling up their eyes, with the head staying completely still.

As greeting
Nodding can also be used as a form of nonverbal greeting or acknowledgement of another's presence; in this context, it is essentially an especially mild form of bowing, with just enough movement to show a degree of respect without additional formality. This includes the traditional downwards nod, or the upwards nod (which is more informal and usually used among friends or subordinates). To increase the formality, the downwards nod may also be accompanied by a suitable verbal greeting.

In America, men often greet other men with whom they make eye contact using a nod. This greeting is often referred to as "the nod". It has been claimed that "many men feel a great deal can be intuited from the gesture [...] replete with all sorts of little nuances."

Nodding syndrome
Nodding is also a symptom of nodding disease, an as-of-yet unexplained disease. It affects mostly children under 15, and was first documented in Tanzania in 1962.

See also 
 Head bobble
 Head shake
 Physical distancing

References

External links

The Straight Dope
Imponderables

Head gestures
Human head and neck